Freeman is a town in Cass County, Missouri, United States. The population was 482 at the 2010 census. It is part of the Kansas City metropolitan area.

History
Freeman was platted in 1871, and named after a railroad official. A post office called Freeman has been in operation since 1871.

Geography
Freeman is located at  (38.617820, -94.507068).

Demographics

2010 census
As of the census of 2010, there were 482 people, 178 households, and 125 families living in the city. The racial makeup of the city was 97.3% White, 0.4% African American, 0.2% Native American, 0.6% from other races, and 1.5% from two or more races. Hispanic or Latino of any race were 0.8% of the population.

There were 178 households, of which 40.4% had children under the age of 18 living with them, 50.6% were married couples living together, 13.5% had a female householder with no husband present, 6.2% had a male householder with no wife present, and 29.8% were non-families. 24.7% of all households were made up of individuals, and 8.9% had someone living alone who was 65 years of age or older. The average household size was 2.71 and the average family size was 3.18.

The median age in the city was 31.4 years. 29% of residents were under the age of 18; 10.5% were between the ages of 18 and 24; 23.1% were from 25 to 44; 26.2% were from 45 to 64; and 11% were 65 years of age or older. The gender makeup of the city was 51.2% male and 48.8% female.

2000 census
As of the census of 2000, there were 521 people, 172 households, and 142 families living in the city. The population density was 1,121.2 people per square mile (437.3/km2). There were 186 housing units at an average density of 400.3 per square mile (156.1/km2). The racial makeup of the city was 97.70% White, 0.19% African American, 1.34% Native American, 0.19% Pacific Islander, and 0.58% from two or more races. Hispanic or Latino of any race were 0.77% of the population.

There were 172 households, out of which 41.3% had children under the age of 18 living with them, 64.0% were married couples living together, 15.7% had a female householder with no husband present, and 17.4% were non-families. 14.5% of all households were made up of individuals, and 7.0% had someone living alone who was 65 years of age or older. The average household size was 3.01 and the average family size was 3.30.

In the city the population was spread out, with 32.4% under the age of 18, 8.1% from 18 to 24, 32.2% from 25 to 44, 15.7% from 45 to 64, and 11.5% who were 65 years of age or older. The median age was 32 years. For every 100 females, there were 88.8 males. For every 100 females age 18 and over, there were 91.3 males.

The median income for a household in the city was $46,339, and the median income for a family was $48,500. Males had a median income of $33,750 versus $23,750 for females. The per capita income for the city was $17,450. About 5.0% of families and 9.1% of the population were below the poverty line, including 13.9% of those under age 18 and 4.6% of those age 65 or over.

References

Cities in Cass County, Missouri
Cities in Missouri